Gonzalo Martínez Ortega (27 April 1934 – 2 June 1998) was a Mexican actor, director, screenwriter and producer. He directed thirteen films and television series between 1973 and 1996.

Filmography

References

External links

1934 births
1998 deaths
Ariel Award winners
Best Director Ariel Award winners
Mexican male film actors
Mexican film directors
Mexican film producers
People from Chihuahua (state)
20th-century Mexican male actors
20th-century Mexican screenwriters
20th-century Mexican male writers